Liversedge F.C. is a football club based in Cleckheaton, England, on the border with Hightown in Liversedge.

Liversedge play their home games at Clayborn, which features a clubhouse to the top west corner of the ground, covered seating at the North, and a small covered-terracing stand to the West behind the goal. In 2017, Liversedge secured much-needed investment from Trevor Best, Managing Director and Founder of Corpad. Best managed Liversedge in the 1990s, and is their current chairman.

Selected facts about Sedge
In the 2004–05 season Liversedge reached the 4th qualifying round of the FA Cup and took Coalville Town to a replay. The draw saw them in the televised draw for the first round proper of the Cup, the stage where the Football League clubs join. Coalville won the replay 2–0 to face Wycombe Wanderers. That season saw Sedge achieve their highest finish in the NCEL, second-placed behind Buxton. Promotion was not granted as the ground was not up to the required standard at that time.

Prior to the 2004–05 season the ground had a large slope from the north to the south. The pitch was dug up in closed season of 2005, and the surface was rebuilt from scratch to make a new, flat field. Liversedge had to play their first few games away for the 2005–06 season while the turf bedded in.

On 25 July 2010, Sedge played a match to mark the club's centenary against a Legends XI including Peter Beagrie and former Huddersfield Town player Simon Trevitt. The Legends won 2–1 with both their goals being scored by Chris Freestone.

Following a couple of seasons curtailed dramatically by the coronavirus pandemic, Liversedge were promoted to the Northern Premier League East due to having finished both the 2019–20 and 2020–21 seasons in the top three of the table (based on a table using a Points Per Games calculation).

For many years Sedge played in a sky blue home shirt but in 2021–22 they started to play in shirts with blue and white stripes on the front and plain white on the back.

At the end of the 2020/2021 season the highest ever polling result for the league goal of the season was when liversedge forward jack hurrell buried the ball into the top corner from the 35yrd mark after a free kick.

In October 2021, Liversedge F.C. went viral on Twitter because their striker Joe Walton had to go in goal in the second round of the FA Trophy against Clitheroe FC following a red card to the Sedge keeper. He made a string of fine saves to get ten-man Sedge to a penalty shootout, which they then won with Walton saving two and scoring one himself as Sedge went through 10–9 on penalties.
Footage of this was retweeted on Twitter and Walton got interviewed on the national radio station Talksport. He was originally a central defender at Sedge before he started playing upfront, and had done the same thing in a cup tie at Barton Town in a previous season.
 Although Sedge have been playing Association Football for more than a hundred years, they can still boast that they have never been relegated.

The closest team, in the Northern Premier League, to Liversedge F.C. is Brighouse Town. Clashes with better-supported Ossett United are regularly held on a Friday night, with requests to arrive early before the match, making it one of the big derby matches in the league.

A record crowd of 1,559 saw Liversedge beat Ossett at Clayborn in their league fixture on 21 January 2022.

Honours
Mervyn Bell Memorial Trophy – 17 July 2021 (beat Dundela FC 3–1)
NCEL – President's Cup 2007–08
NCEL – League Cup 2005–06
Reserve Team Cup – 2002–03
West Riding County Challenge Cup – 1948–49 1951–52 1969–70
West Riding County Cup – 1989–90 2021–22
West Riding County – Amateur League 1923–24 1925–26 1926–27 1964–65 1965–66 1968–69.
Spen Valley League Cup – 1947–48 1948–49
Spen Valley League – 1948–49
Wheatley Cup – 1919–20 1950–51 1952–53 1953–54 1955–56 1960–61 1961–62 1964–65 1967–68 1968–69
Bradford Hospital Cup – 1924–25
Bradford League – 1920–21
Northern Premier League East Division Champions – 2021–22

League history

Seasons

Current season 2021–22

Current squad

Northern Premier League : East Division

Emirates FA Cup

FA Trophy

West Riding County Cup

Gallery

References

External links
 Official Website
 Northern Counties East League
 West Riding County Amateur Football League
 Northern Under-19 Alliance West Division
 Spenborough Guardian

Football clubs in England
Northern Counties East Football League
Sport in Kirklees
Yorkshire Football League
Football clubs in West Yorkshire
Association football clubs established in 1910
1910 establishments in England
Cleckheaton
Northern Premier League clubs